Kingwell was the former name of Mussel Harbor, a village located on Long Island in Placentia Bay. It had a population of 243 in 1940 and 198 in 1956.

See also
 List of communities in Newfoundland and Labrador

Ghost towns in Newfoundland and Labrador

Formerly called Mussel Harbor Arm, Kingwell is a village located on Long Island in Placentia Bay.  It had a population of 243 in 1940 and 198 in 1956. The community was resettled in the 1960s but some former residents and their descendants have summer homes there and return every year for extended periods.